The 2019 KBS Drama Awards, presented by Korean Broadcasting System (KBS), was held on December 31, 2019 at KBS Hall in Yeouido, Seoul. It was hosted by Jeon Hyun-moo and Shin Hye-sun.

Winners and nominees

See also
2019 SBS Drama Awards
2019 MBC Drama Awards

References

External links 
 
 

Korean Broadcasting System original programming
2019 television awards
KBS Drama Awards
2019 in South Korea
December 2019 events in South Korea